Spilarctia costata is a moth in the family Erebidae. It was described by Jean Baptiste Boisduval in 1832. It is found in Papua, Papua New Guinea and on the Bismarck Archipelago.

References

Moths described in 1832
costata